Benton is a meteorite found near the village of Benton, New Brunswick following a fireball. Two masses were found but the meteorites were split up. The largest fragment is now in the Canadian National Meteorite Collection, Ottawa.

Classification
It is classified as LL6-ordinary chondrite.

The geological history of Benton has four stages: chondrule formation and accumulation,  brecciation, thermal metamorphism and finally shock vein formation.

See also
 Glossary of meteoritics
 Meteorite fall

References

Meteorites found in Canada
1949 in New Brunswick